Hariysh Krishnakumar (born 23 October 2002) is a Singaporean footballer currently playing as a midfielder for Balestier Khalsa.

Club

Balestier Khalsa
He signed for the club in 2021 from Geylang International.

Career statistics

Club

Notes

References

External links
 

2002 births
Living people
Singaporean footballers
Singaporean people of Tamil descent
Singaporean sportspeople of Indian descent
Association football defenders
Singapore Premier League players
Balestier Khalsa FC players